James Lane Buckley (born March 9, 1923) is an American politician and jurist who currently serves as a senior judge on the United States Court of Appeals for the District of Columbia Circuit. Buckley served in the United States Senate as a member of the Conservative Party of New York State in the Republican caucus from 1971 to 1977, and in multiple positions within the Reagan administration. He was also the Republican nominee in the 1980 Connecticut Senate race, but was defeated by Democrat Chris Dodd.

In 1970, Buckley was elected to the U.S. Senate as the nominee of the Conservative Party of New York; he won 39 percent of the vote and served from 1971 until 1977. During the first Reagan administration, Buckley served as Undersecretary of State for International Security Affairs. He was also President of Radio Free Europe/Radio Liberty from 1982 to 1985.

Buckley was nominated by President Ronald Reagan to a seat on the United States Court of Appeals for the District of Columbia Circuit on October 16, 1985. He was confirmed by the United States Senate on December 17, 1985 and received commission on December 17, 1985. Buckley assumed senior status on August 31, 1996. He is one of the few people in modern times to have served in the executive, legislative and judicial branches of the Federal government.

Early life, education, and early career
James Lane Buckley was born on March 9, 1923, in New York City, New York, to Aloise Steiner and William Frank Buckley Sr., the fourth of ten children to the couple. He is the older brother of the late conservative writer William F. Buckley Jr. and the uncle of Christopher Taylor Buckley. He is also the uncle of Brent Bozell III and political consultant William F. B. O'Reilly. His mother, from New Orleans, was of Swiss-German, German, and Irish descent, while his paternal grandparents, from Hamilton, Ontario, Canada, were of Irish ancestry.

Buckley attended Millbrook School, and in 1943 earned a Bachelor of Arts degree in English from Yale University, where he was a member of Skull and Bones. He enlisted in the United States Navy in 1942, and during World War II he participated in the battles of Leyte, Lingayen Gulf, and Okinawa. Buckley was discharged with the rank of Lieutenant (junior grade). in 1946. After receiving his Bachelor of Laws from Yale Law School in 1949, he was admitted to the Connecticut bar in 1950 and practiced law until 1953, when he joined The Catawba Corporation as vice president and director. In 1965, he managed his brother William F. Buckley, Jr.'s campaign for Mayor of New York. Meanwhile, in May 1953, he married Ann Frances Cooley, with whom he had six children before her death on December 30, 2011.

Career

United States Senate

Elections

1968

In 1968, Buckley ran for the senatorial nomination of the Conservative Party of New York State, after his brother William F. Buckley Jr. had served as the party's mayoral nominee in the 1965 New York City mayoral election. Buckley won the party's nomination on April 2, 1968, with the unanimous support of all forty state committeemen. Buckley placed third in the general election behind Republican nominee Jacob Javits and Democratic nominee Paul O'Dwyer after receiving 1,139,402 votes (17.31%).

1970

On March 16, 1968, Robert F. Kennedy announced that he would seek the presidential nomination of the Democratic Party for the 1968 presidential election. After winning four primaries Kennedy was assassinated by Sirhan Sirhan in Los Angeles, California on June 6.

Kennedy's death left a vacancy in the United States Senate that would be filled through an appointment by Governor Nelson Rockefeller. John W. Gardner, John Lindsay, Burke Marshall, C. Douglas Dillon, Charles Goodell, Ogden Reid, and Whitney Young were all mentioned as possible candidates for the appointment. On August 11, a spokesman for Rockefeller stated that the main choices for the appointment were Gardner, Goodell, and Reid. On September 10, Rockefeller appointed Goodell, a member of the House of Representatives from the 38th congressional district, to fill the vacancy.

On April 6, 1970, Buckley announced that he would seek the Conservative Party's senatorial nomination again. The Conservative State Committee convened inside Hotel McAlpin in Manhattan, New York City, on April 7, to select the party's nominees in the general election. Kevin P. McGovern attempted to force a primary campaign between himself and Buckley but failed to receive the 25% of delegate votes necessary for a primary. Buckley received nearly ninety percent of the delegate votes and the remainder was split between McGovern and abstaining delegates.

On June 20, F. Clifton White, Buckley's campaign manager, announced that Buckley's campaign would circulate petitions in an attempt to gain another ballot line named the Independent Alliance Party. Enough valid signatures were collected to gain the additional ballot line, but Secretary of State John P. Lomenzo ruled that the Independent Alliance's emblem, an outline of New York with Buckley's name inside, was illegal as New York's election law limited the number of times that a candidate's name could appear on a ballot line to one. Lomenzo later allowed the party onto the ballot after the emblem was changed to a shield with the letter "I" inside.

In the general election Buckley defeated Goodell, and Ottinger. Although the Independent Alliance Party received over 100,000 votes in the general election, more than the 50,000 votes required to become an official party and automatic ballot access, it did not become an official party as its only candidate was Buckley, who ran in the Senate election and not in the gubernatorial election where the 50,000 votes were required to come from.

1976

In 1971, Buckley spoke to the Republican National Finance committee about running for reelection in the 1976 elections with the Republican nomination. Peter A. Peyser challenged him in the Republican primary, but Buckley defeated him. Buckley gained Rockefeller's support by agreeing to not support Ronald Reagan's campaign against Gerald Ford in the Republican presidential primaries.

Tenure
During his tenure in the United States Senate Buckley's political affiliation was referred to as Conservative-Republican of New York (C-R-N.Y). The Republican caucus in the Senate voted 36 to 3 in favor of admitting Buckley into their caucus, with Senators Jacob Javits, John Sherman Cooper, and William B. Saxbe all opposing Buckley's admittance to the caucus.

In 1971, Buckley was appointed to the air and water pollution, roads, and economic development sub-committees within the United States Senate Committee on Environment and Public Works. Buckley supported Richard Nixon during the 1972 presidential election and called for the Conservative Party, which had not supported Nixon during the 1968 presidential election, to support Nixon.

In 1974, Buckley proposed a Human Life Amendment to the U.S. Constitution. If passed, the Amendment would have defined the term "person" in the Fourteenth Amendment to include the embryo. His enacted legislation includes the Family Educational Rights and Privacy Act (FERPA) that governs use of student records and the Protection of Pupils' Rights Act (PPRA) that requires parent notification, right to review, and consent for administration of student surveys to minors if the survey collects information on any of eight specified topics.

In the spring of 1974, with the Watergate scandal continuing to grow in magnitude and seriousness, Buckley surprised and, in some cases, angered some of his allies among Republicans when he called upon the increasingly-embattled Richard M. Nixon to voluntarily resign the presidency. Buckley said that in doing so, he was making no judgment as to Nixon's technical legal guilt or innocence of the accusations made against him and in fact denounced those "in and out of the media who have been exploiting the Watergate affair so recklessly" in what he called an effort "to subvert the decisive mandate of the 1972 election." However, he said that the burgeoning scandal might result in an impeachment process that would tear the country even further apart and so he declared: "There is one way and one way only by which the crisis can be resolved, and the country pulled out of the Watergate swamp. I propose an extraordinary act of statesmanship and courage—an act at once noble and heartbreaking; at once serving the greater interests of the nation, the institution of the Presidency, and the stated goals for which he so successfully campaigned"—Nixon's resignation. Buckley was the first major conservative figure to call for resignation. Nixon did not resign at that time but eventually did lose the support of key Republican figures, including Senator Barry Goldwater. Nixon ultimately resigned on August 9, 1974.

Buckley was the lead petitioner in a landmark Supreme Court case, Buckley v. Valeo (1976), which "shaped modern campaign-finance law".

1976 Republican National Convention
During the 1976 Republican National Convention, then-Senator Jesse Helms encouraged a "Draft Buckley" movement in an effort to stop the nomination of Ronald Reagan for President. (Reagan had announced that Pennsylvania Senator Richard Schweiker would be his running mate; Helms objected to this decision, believing Schweiker to be too liberal.) The "Draft Buckley" movement was rendered moot when President Gerald Ford narrowly won the party's nomination on the first ballot.<ref>World Almanac and Book of Facts 1977</ref>

Post-Senate career

After his loss in the 1976 election, Buckley worked for Donaldson, Lufkin & Jenrette, becoming a member of the executive committee and of its board of directors and eventually advancing to the position of corporate director.

After his loss in Connecticut, Buckley served in the Reagan administration, first as an undersecretary of State for security assistance, managing military aid to strategically located countries, and then as President of Radio Free Europe/Radio Liberty in Munich from 1982 to 1985.

U.S. Court of Appeals for D.C.
On October 16, 1985, Buckley was nominated by President Ronald Reagan to a seat on the United States Court of Appeals for the District of Columbia Circuit. The seat had previously been held by Judge Edward Allen Tamm. Buckley was confirmed by the United States Senate on December 17, 1985 and received commission on December 17, 1985. He assumed senior status on August 31, 1996.

Later life
During the 2016 presidential election Buckley was critical of Democratic nominee Hillary Clinton and Republican nominee Donald Trump. He stated that his brother William and Reagan would have been shocked by Trump's actions. He stated that he mostly agreed with Libertarian nominee Gary Johnson.

Buckley became the oldest living former Senator following the death of Senator Fritz Hollings in 2019. Buckley turned 100 on March 9, 2023.

Political positions

Buckley introduced and led the passage of the Family Educational Rights and Privacy Act, but later in 2010 he publicly supported amendment of the legislation due to college athletic departments using the legislation to hide sexual abuse allegations. He voted against a minimum wage increase in 1974. Buckley was one of eight senators to vote against the Equal Rights Amendment.

Electoral history

Books
Buckley is the author of the following books:

 If Men Were Angels: A View from the Senate (1975)
 Gleanings from an Unplanned Life (2006)
 Freedom at Risk: Reflections on Politics, Liberty, and the State (2010) 
 Saving Congress from Itself: Emancipating the States & Empowering Their People (2014)

Buckley discussed Freedom at Risk on C-SPAN on January 12, 2011. Buckley’s last book, “Saving Congress From Itself”, was sent to every member of the U.S. Senate by Dallas businessman and Buckley family devotee Chris M. Lantrip.

References

Further reading
 Buckley, James Lane (1975). If Men Were Angels: A View From the Senate. New York: Putnam. .
 Buckley, James Lane (2006). Gleanings from an Unplanned Life: An Annotated Oral History. Wilmington: Intercollegiate Studies institute. .
 Buckley, James Lane (2010). Freedom at Risk: Reflections on Politics, Liberty, and the State. New York: Encounter Books. .
 Buckley, James Lane (2014). Saving Congress from Itself: Emancipating the States and Empowering Their People.'' New York: Encounter Books.

External links
 
 
 Official website of James L. Buckley [incorrect link]
 

|-

|-

|-

|-

|-

|-

|-

|-

1923 births
American centenarians
Living people
20th-century American judges
20th-century American male writers
20th-century American non-fiction writers
20th-century American politicians
21st-century American male writers
21st-century American non-fiction writers
American people of Irish descent
American people of Swiss-German descent
Buckley family
Candidates in the 1968 United States elections
Candidates in the 1976 United States presidential election
Candidates in the 1980 United States elections
Connecticut Republicans
Connecticut lawyers
Conservative Party of New York State politicians
Judges of the United States Court of Appeals for the D.C. Circuit
Military personnel from New York City
New Right (United States)
New York (state) Republicans
Radio Free Europe/Radio Liberty people
Reagan administration personnel
Republican Party United States senators from New York (state)
Skull and Bones Society
United States Navy officers
United States Navy personnel of World War II
United States Under Secretaries of State
United States court of appeals judges appointed by Ronald Reagan
Writers from Connecticut
Writers from New York City
Yale Law School alumni
Men centenarians